The 2011–12 Oklahoma Sooners basketball team represents the University of Oklahoma in the 2011–12 NCAA Division I men's basketball season. The Sooners are led by Lon Kruger in his first season. The team plays its home games at the Lloyd Noble Center in Norman, Oklahoma and are members of the Big 12 Conference.

Preseason

Coaching Change
On March 14, 2011, Oklahoma fired Jeff Capel, after the Sooners had back-to-back losing seasons for the first time since 1967. Capel led the Sooners to a 17-36 record since Blake Griffin left for the NBA. Overall, Capel was 96-69 in five seasons. Capel received a $1.75 million buyout from Oklahoma. On April 2, 2011, it was announced that Lon Kruger would leave UNLV to become the Sooners new coach. Kruger will be paid about $2.2 million annually.

Preseason Poll
The Sooners were picked to finish 9th in conference play.

Class of 2011

|}

Roster
Source

The Sooners' second leading scorer, Calvin Newell, transferred to the University of Central Florida. Newell decided to leave Oklahoma due to family issues.

Schedule

|-
!colspan=9| Exhibition

|-
!colspan=9| Regular Season

|-
! colspan=9|2012 Big 12 men's basketball tournament

Rankings

References

External links
Official Athletics Site of the Oklahoma Sooners - Men's Basketball

Oklahoma Sooners men's basketball seasons
Oklahoma